The 1993 Dutch Open was an ATP men's tennis tournament played on outdoor clay courts in Hilversum, Netherlands that was part of the World Series category of the 1993 ATP Tour. It was the 35th edition of the tournament and was held from 26 July until 1 August 1993. Unseeded Carlos Costa won the singles title.

Finals

Singles

 Carlos Costa defeated  Magnus Gustafsson, 6–1, 6–2, 6–3
 It was Costa's 1st singles title of the year and the 3rd of his career.

Doubles

 Jacco Eltingh /  Paul Haarhuis defeated  Hendrik Jan Davids /  Libor Pimek 4–6, 6–2, 7–5

References

 
Dutch Open (tennis), 1993